The Honourable Raymond Harvey Lodge Joseph de Montmorency VC (5 February 1867 – 23 February 1900) was a British recipient of the Victoria Cross (VC), the highest and most prestigious award for gallantry in the face of the enemy that can be awarded to British and Commonwealth forces. (Also considered a Canadian recipient due to his place of birth).

Early life career
De Montmorency was born in Montreal, Quebec, Canada, the eldest son and heir of Major-General Reymond de Montmorency, 3rd Viscount Frankfort de Montmorency, Representative Peer of Ireland, who served in the Crimean War, the Indian Rebellion, Abyssinia and the Mahdist War, and his wife Rachel Mary Lumley Godolphin Michel, daughter of Field Marshal Sir John Michel.

He was commissioned a second lieutenant in the Lincolnshire Regiment on 14 September 1887, and transferred to the 21st Lancers as he was promoted to lieutenant on 6 November 1889.

Details of Victoria Cross

De Montmorency was 31 years old, and a lieutenant in the 21st Lancers (Empress of India's), British Army during the Sudan Campaign when the following deed took place for which he was awarded the VC:

On 2 September 1898 at the Battle of Omdurman, Sudan, after the charge, Lieutenant de Montmorency returned to help an officer who was lying surrounded by a great many Dervishes. He drove the Dervishes off and finding that the officer was dead, put the body on his horse which then broke away. Captain Paul Aloysius Kenna and a corporal then came to his assistance and he was able to rejoin his regiment. His citation read:

Later military career
De Montmorency was promoted to the rank of captain on 2 August 1899, having in the previous October been despatched on special service to South Africa, where he raised and commanded a special body of scouts, Montmorency's Scouts. Following the outbreak of the Second Boer War in October 1899, the Scouts were involved in fighting in Cape Colony. He was killed in action at the Battle of Stormberg, Dordrecht, Cape Colony, on 23 February 1900.

References

British recipients of the Victoria Cross
21st Lancers officers
British Army personnel of the Mahdist War
British Army personnel of the Second Boer War
1867 births
1900 deaths
Military personnel from Montreal
British military personnel killed in the Second Boer War
People educated at Marlborough College
Royal Lincolnshire Regiment officers
Heirs apparent who never acceded
Graduates of the Royal Military College, Sandhurst
British Army recipients of the Victoria Cross
Burials in South Africa